Damian Dąbrowski (born 27 August 1992) is a Polish professional footballer who plays as a midfielder for Pogoń Szczecin.

International career
Dąbrowski got his first call up to the senior Poland side for 2018 FIFA World Cup qualifiers against Denmark and Armenia in October 2016. On 14 November 2016, Dąbrowski got his first steps on the field against Slovenia in Wroclaw. Dąbrowski went through several Polish junior teams before being invited to the Polish national team’s international match against Armenia in late 2016.

Career statistics

Club

International

References

Notes 
 
 

1992 births
Living people
People from Kamienna Góra
Polish footballers
Zagłębie Lubin players
MKS Cracovia (football) players
Pogoń Szczecin players
Ekstraklasa players
I liga players
Sportspeople from Lower Silesian Voivodeship
Association football midfielders
Poland youth international footballers
Poland under-21 international footballers
Poland international footballers